Haryana Vikas Party (HVP) (translation: Haryana Development Party) was a political party in the Indian state of Haryana. Its president was Bansi Lal and general secretary Chaudhary Surender Singh.

After parted company with Congress in 1996, Bansi Lal set up the Haryana Vikas Party and his campaign against prohibition propelled him to power in the assembly polls the same year.On 14 October 2004 HVP merged with the Indian National Congress.

See also
Indian National Congress breakaway parties

2004 disestablishments in India
Defunct political parties in Haryana
Former member parties of the National Democratic Alliance
Indian National Congress breakaway groups
Political parties disestablished in 2004
Political parties with year of establishment missing